The Karukaru River is a river of New Zealand. A tributary of the Wairua River, it rises west of Maungatapere and flows westward into that river south of Titoki.

See also
List of rivers of New Zealand

References

Rivers of the Northland Region
Rivers of New Zealand
Kaipara Harbour catchment